Ronchois is a commune in the Seine-Maritime department in the Normandy region in northern France.

Geography
The A29 autoroute passes through the northern part of the commune's territory.

Population

Places of interest
 The nineteenth century church of St. Jean.
 Trinity church at Ormesnil, dating from the seventeenth century.

See also
Communes of the Seine-Maritime department

References

Communes of Seine-Maritime